Abu ol Abbas (also Romanized as Abū ol ‘Abbās; also known as Ab-ol-Abbās, Bolāvās, Bulāwās, Mangasht, Mongasht, and Mongast) is a village in Mongasht Rural District, in the Central District of Bagh-e Malek County, Khuzestan Province, Iran. At the 2006 census, its population was 1,998, in 428 families.

References 

Populated places in Bagh-e Malek County